The VK engine (formerly known as the ZH) is a V8 piston engine from Nissan. It is an aluminum DOHC 4-valve design.

The VK engine was originally based on Nissan's VQ V6 rather than the VH V8 used in previous Q45/Cima models. Changes include: a variable intake manifold, newly designed heads, and a larger drive by wire throttle chamber. The intake manifold directs air through different paths at different engine speeds to optimise low-end torque or high-end horsepower.

VK45DE 

The  VK45DE was introduced in 2002 and is built in Yokohama, Japan. Redline is at 6,600 rpm. It has an aluminum engine block and aluminum DOHC cylinder heads. It uses SFI, has 4 titanium valves per cylinder with VVT and features forged steel connecting rods, 4 one-piece cast camshafts, an unusual variable-flow induction system optimizes airflow for low- and high-speed operation, low-friction molybdenum-coated pistons, and a microfinished crankshaft.

Motorsport

A flat-plane crankshaft version of the VK45DE was used by Nismo for Super GT races with the Nissan GT-R instead of using the GT-R's VR38DETT twin-turbo V6 engine. The VK45DE was previously used in Nissan's 350Z Super GT car in 2007, replacing the previous VQ30DETT used in that car. The engine idles at around 3,500 rpm and is restricted to the above specified power output. Nismo reasons that by using the engine, they eliminate turbo lag, save weight and generally prefer the torque curve of the atmospheric V8.

Applications

VK45DD 
The VK45DD is a  V8 engine that is very similar to the VK45DE but adds a direct injection fuel system. This was Nissan's first V8 with direct injection (NEO-Di).

Applications
 2001–2004 Nissan Cima (JDM)

VK50VE 

The valvetrain is a dual overhead cam (DOHC) design with a continuously variable valve timing control system (CVTCS). The engine also features Nissan's VVEL valve timing technology.

Applications
 2009–2013 Infiniti FX50
 2014 Infiniti QX70

VK56DE 

The VK56DE is a  version built in Decherd, Tennessee. It has aluminum-alloy block and heads and low-friction molybdenum-coated pistons. The valvetrain is a dual overhead cam (DOHC) design with a continuously variable valve timing control system (CVTCS) on the intake valves. It also has 4 valves per cylinder with micro-finished camshafts and ductile iron cylinder liners for increased durability.

Motorsport

Nismo also uses the VK56DE for FIA GT1 racing.

The Nissan Motorsport VK56DE was launched in Australia for the V8 Supercars Championship in 2013 by Kelly Racing in Melbourne. It will be fitted to a Nissan Altima version of the V8 Supercars "Car of the Future" specification that will compete from 2013 onwards.

Applications

Notes:
 The Titan, Armada, and Pathfinder power figures are for regular 87 octane fuel. The  Infiniti QX56 & Nissan Patrol are tuned  for premium (91+ octane) fuel.
 Some VK56DE powered vehicles are E85 capable.

VK56VD 

The VK56VD is a  32-valve, DOHC, Direct Injection Gasoline (DIG) aluminum-alloy V8 and features Nissan's advanced VVEL (Variable Valve Event & Lift System). The direct injection system provides better wide-open throttle performance and improved fuel economy and emissions performance by reducing engine knock, improving combustion stability and controlling injection more precisely.

Applications

References

See also 
 List of Nissan engines
 Nissan VRH Racing Engines

VK
V8 engines
Gasoline engines by model